The 2022 Costa Rican Cup (known as Torneo de Copa 2022 Suerox for sponsorship reasons) was the 4th staging of the Costa Rican Cup, and the first edition since 2015, following a seven-year hiatus. The tournament was dedicated to Anthony Vargas, goalkeeping coach for Guadalupe who had died from a heart attack during a training in October 2022, aged 29.

The tournament featured all twelve teams from the Liga FPD plus four sides from the Segunda División de Costa Rica. The format consisted in a knockout tournament, starting from the Round 16 to the final, with all stages (including the final) being double-legged.

Cartaginés, who entered the tournament as the most recent champions after winning the 2015 edition, won the cup by defeating Herediano in the finals. It is the third consecutive time that Cartaginés wins the Costa Rican Cup.

Participating teams
Sixteen teams will participate in the 2022 Costa Rican Cup.

All twelve teams from the 2022–23 Liga FPD season:

Alajuelense
Cartaginés
Grecia
Guadalupe
Herediano
Guanacasteca

Pérez Zeledón
Puntarenas
San Carlos
Santos
Saprissa
Sporting

Four teams from the 2022–23 Liga de Ascenso season:

Santa Ana
Sarchí

Turrialba
Uruguay de Coronado

Bracket
The bracket is divided into two sub-brackets, named Bracket A and Bracket B.

Round of 16

Summary

Bracket A
The first legs were played on 15–17 November, and the second legs were played on 25–27 November.

|}

Bracket B
The first legs were played on 18–20 November, and the second legs were played on 22–24 November.

|}

Matches
Bracket A

Herediano won 3–0 on aggregate.

Tied 2–2 on aggregate, Puntarenas won on penalties and advanced to the quarter-finals.

Grecia won 3–1 on aggregate.

Alajuelense won 3–1 on aggregate.
Bracket B

Saprissa won 6–0 on aggregate.

Tied 5–5 on aggregate, Santos won on penalties and advanced to the quarter-finals.

Cartaginés won 2–0 on aggregate.

Sporting won 5–1 on aggregate.

Quarterfinals

Summary

Bracket A
The first legs were played on 30 November, and the second legs were played on 4 December.

|}
Bracket B
The first legs were played on 29 November, and the second legs were played on 3 December.

|}

Matches
Bracket A

Herediano won 3–0 on aggregate.

Alajuelense won 6–2 on aggregate.
Bracket B

Saprissa won 4–1 on aggregate.

Cartaginés won 2–1 on aggregate.

Semi-finals

Summary

Semi-final A
The first leg was played on 8 December, while the second leg was played on 11 December.

|}
Semi-final B
The first leg was played on 7 December, while the second leg was played on 11 December.

|}

Matches
Semi-final A

Herediano won 2–1 on aggregate.
Semi-final B

Cartaginés won 4–1 on aggregate.

Finals

Summary

The first leg was played on 15 December, while the second leg was played on 21 December.

|}

Matches

Cartaginés won 3–2 on aggregate.

Top goalscorers

Notes

References

External links
Torneo de Copa 2022 at UNAFUT.com

 

Costa Rican Cup
2022–23 in Costa Rican football